Paulo Suruagy do Amaral Dantas (born March 19, 1979)is a Brazilian politician affiliated with the Brazilian Democratic Movement (MDB). Was former governor of Alagoas.

Biography 
Born in Maceió, the capital city of Alagoas, he is the son of former president of the Legislative Assembly of Alagoas Luiz Dantas. In 2004, he was elected as mayor in the municipality of Batalha, being re-elected in 2008.

On May 15, 2022, he was indirectly elected for a "buffer term" until December 31, 2022, through the Legislative Assembly of Alagoas, after the last directly elected governor, Renan Filho, resigned in order to run for the Senate in the 2022 Brazilian general election and the Vice Governor at the time Luciano Barbosa, had resigned in 2020 after being elected as the mayor of Arapiraca.

Dantas is currently running for a first full term as Governor of Alagoas. He received 46.64% of the vote in the first round and will face right-wing candidate Rodrigo Cunha in the second round.

References 

Governors of Alagoas
Living people
1979 births
Brazilian Democratic Movement politicians